Lee Moore is the name of:

 Lee Moore (country singer) (1914–1997), American country musician and radio DJ
 Lee Moore (politician) (1939–2000), prime minister of Saint Kitts and Nevis
 Lee Moore (athlete) (born 1988), American hurdler, see United States at the 2011 Pan American Games
 Lee Moore (basketball) (born 1995), American basketball player

See also
Lemoore, California, city in California formerly named "Lee Moore's"

Moore (surname)